The Intuitionist is a 1999 speculative fiction novel by American writer Colson Whitehead.

The Intuitionist takes place in a city (implicitly, New York) full of skyscrapers and other buildings requiring vertical transportation in the form of elevators. The time, never identified explicitly, is one when black people are called "colored" and integration is a current topic. The protagonist is Lila Mae Watson, an elevator inspector of the "Intuitionist" school. The Intuitionists practice an inspecting method by which they ride in an elevator and intuit the state of the elevator and its related systems. The competing school, the "Empiricists", insists upon traditional instrument-based verification of the condition of the elevator. Watson is the second black inspector and the first black female inspector in the city.

Plot summary

The story begins with the catastrophic failure of an elevator which Watson had inspected just days before, leading to suspicion cast upon both herself and the Intuitionist school as a whole. To cope with the inspectorate, the corporate elevator establishment, and other looming elements, she must return to her intellectual roots, the texts (both known and lost) of the founder of the school, to try to reconstruct what is happening around her.

In the course of her search, she discovers the central idea of the founder of Intuitionism – that of the "black box", the perfect elevator, which will deliver the people to the city of the future.

Characters
 Lila Mae Watson: Protagonist
 James Fulton: Founder of Intuitionism (dead before the story starts)
 Raymond Coombs: Spy for a big elevator company (disguised as "Natchez", a poor nephew of Fulton's interested in the black box and in Lila Mae)
 Marie Claire Rogers: Fulton's servant and heir
 Ben Urich: Reporter who has written a story on the black box for Lift magazine
 Jim Corrigan and John Murphy: Thugs
 Frank Chancre: President of the Elevator Guild, Empiricist
 Orville Lever: Liberal and Intuitionist candidate for the presidency of the Elevator Guild
 Mr. Reed: Lever's secretary and campaign manager
 Charles "Chuck" Gould: Mere escalator inspector, on good terms with Lila Mae
 Pompey: Black elevator inspector, Empiricist

Critical reception 

A Newsweek review wrote, "255 pages of the most engaging literary sleuthing you'll read this year," and "What makes the novel so extraordinary is the ways in which Whitehead plays with notions of race." Walter Kirn, writing in Time, called it "The freshest racial allegory since Ralph Ellison's Invisible Man and Toni Morrison's The Bluest Eye."

Gary Krist, writing in The New York Times, said it was an "ingenious and starkly original first novel."

A review in the San Francisco Chronicle compared it to Catch-22, and Thomas Pynchon's V. and The Crying of Lot 49.

Honors 

 Quality Paperback Book Club New Voices Award
 Finalist, Hemingway Foundation/PEN Award
 New York Times Notable Book

References 

1999 American novels
1999 science fiction novels
Novels by Colson Whitehead
Novels set in New York City
Postmodern novels
1999 speculative fiction novels
Works set in elevators
1999 debut novels
Anchor Books books